Presidential elections were held in Ecuador in 1888. The result was a victory for Antonio Flores Jijón, who received 97% of the vote. He took office on 1 July.

Results

References

Presidential elections in Ecuador
Ecuador
1888 in Ecuador
Election and referendum articles with incomplete results